Crawley is a constituency in West Sussex represented in the House of Commons of the UK Parliament since 2010 by Henry Smith of the Conservative Party.

Constituency profile
The constituency covers the whole of the town and borough of Crawley in West Sussex, and London Gatwick Airport is a significant employment centre.  Residents' health and wealth are around average for the UK.

Boundaries

1983–1997: The Borough of Crawley, and the District of Mid Sussex wards of Balcombe, Copthorne and Worth, Crawley Down, Slaugham, and Turners Hill.

1997–present: The Borough of Crawley.

The Boundary Commission analysed population increase and recommended that changes to the constituency be made for the 2010 general election so the seat is now coterminous with the borough.

History

Contents and context
Before the 1983 general election, Crawley had been part of the Horsham & Crawley, Horsham, and Horsham & Worthing constituencies at times. Due to the growth of Crawley, which was a small town, into a substantial new town in the 1960s and 70s, the Boundary Commission took the decision to separate it from Horsham in 1983 and create a new seat.

Political history
Labour majorities in 1997 and 2001 on the size of majority yardstick, but not yet the longevity measure, suggested a safe seat. The seat saw the most marginal result in 2005 with a margin of only 37 votes.  Psephologists and editors have long identified the marginality of most of the largest new towns and outer satellite cities in Southern England as to those seats with a workforce across diverse sectors (e.g. Bristol, Exeter, Gloucester, Milton Keynes, Hemel Hempstead, Reading, Southampton, Portsmouth, Dover).  Few communities in these seats are rooted in Victorian villa toryism nor in Labour's heartlands that for decades depended on heavy industry (the main coalfields, the Lancashire Mill Towns, the Potteries/Black Country, steelworking, dockworking and shipbuilding areas).

In the 2010 election Conservative, Smith, won the seat having twice failed, by 5,928 votes. He gained a not unprecedented (averaged two-party) swing of 6.3%. Smith's later majorities have been 6,526 in 2015; and 2,459 in 2017, elections where the Liberal Democrats, Scepanovic and Yousuf, along with the 2017 candidate for East Worthing and Shoreham in West Sussex lost their deposits by failing to attract 5% of the vote.

Members of Parliament

Elections

Elections in the 2010s 

The Brexit Party announced Wayne Bayley as their candidate, but he was withdrawn as part of the UK-wide Brexit Party decision not to oppose sitting Conservative candidates.

The Green Party announced Richard Kail as their candidate, but he did not stand. UKIP also decided not to stand a candidate for the first time since 1997.

The Christian Peoples Alliance announced Katherine Mills as candidate, but she did not stand.

Elections in the 2000s

Elections in the 1990s

This constituency underwent boundary changes between the 1992 and 1997 generalelections and thus change in share of vote is based on a notional calculation.

Elections in the 1980s

See also 
 List of parliamentary constituencies in West Sussex

Notes

References

Sources 
Election result, 2005 (BBC)
Election results, 1997 - 2001 (BBC)
Election results, 1997 - 2001 (Election Demon)
Election results, 1983 - 1992 (Election Demon)
Election results, 1992 - 2005  (Guardian)

Parliamentary constituencies in South East England
Constituencies of the Parliament of the United Kingdom established in 1983
Politics of West Sussex
UK Parliament constituency, Crawley